Fântânele is a commune in Prahova County, Muntenia, Romania. It is composed of two villages, Bozieni and Fântânele. It also included Ghinoaica, Ungureni and Vadu Săpat villages until 2004, when they were split off to form Vadu Săpat commune.

References

Communes in Prahova County
Localities in Muntenia